Kyle Pratt may refer to:
 Kyle Pratt, a character in Flightplan
 Kyle Pratt, a player on the 2008 Florida Gators football team